The Akatlar Sanatçılar Parki or Artists' Park is a public park operated by the Beşiktaş municipality in Akatlar, Beşiktaş. It is the home of many sculptures of famous Turkish artists and also hosts theater performances and other activities.

The park aims to show a piece of all 7 branches of art through the many busts and hand imprints of famous Turkish artists found inside the park. These include busts of Kemal Sunal, Barış Manço, Sadri Alışık and Bedia Muvahhit which were sculpted by Gürdal Duyar. The park also has a lot of green space and includes a 1500m2 running track and has other sports oriented areas.
The park is free to enter.

In July 2022 the park was renamed to Cüneyt Arkın Sanatçılar Parkı in memory of Arkın who passed away June 2022.

The park was opened in 2003, is about 480 decare in size.

There is a cafeteria located in the park that is operated by the Beşiktaş municipality. It is known as the Sanatçılar Kafe and is open from 8 A.M. to 11 P.M. 

On the 59th anniversary of the death of Nâzım Hikmet he was honored in a ceremony at the park where his poems were read.

Photos

Notes

References

Sources 

Parks in Istanbul
Sculptures by Gürdal Duyar